Luis Méndez may refer to:

 Luis Méndez (boxer) (born 1969), Uruguayan boxer
 Luis Méndez (Bolivian footballer) (born 1985), Bolivian football centre back
 Luis Mendez (Belizean footballer) (1990–2013), Belizean football defender
 Luis Méndez (sport shooter) (born 1959), Uruguayan sports shooter
 Luis Gerardo Méndez (born 1982), Mexican actor and producer
 Luis Enrique Méndez (born 1973), Cuban Greco-Roman wrestler
 Luis Soto Mendez (born 1995), Costa Rican artistic gymnast